Mountain huts in the Alps
Mountain huts in France

Refuge de la Dent d'Oche is a refuge in the French Alps.